Moreno Rutten (born 28 April 1993) is a Dutch professional footballer who plays as a right back for NAC Breda in the Eerste Divisie. He formerly played for FC Den Bosch, VVV-Venlo and Crotone.

Club career
On 17 June 2019, he signed a 3-year contract with the Italian club Crotone.

Honours

Club
VVV-Venlo
Eerste Divisie: 2016–17

References

External links
 

Living people
1993 births
Sportspeople from 's-Hertogenbosch
Association football defenders
Dutch footballers
FC Den Bosch players
VVV-Venlo players
F.C. Crotone players
NAC Breda players
Eredivisie players
Eerste Divisie players
Dutch expatriate footballers
Expatriate footballers in Italy
Footballers from North Brabant